Okie Noodling is a 2001 documentary film examining the practice of handfishing in rural Oklahoma.

Plot
The film documents "noodling" the practice of wading in murky water and reaching into dark holes in the attempt to catch a catfish, a dangerous practice that often causes noodlers to lose fingers and toes. The method is hundreds of years old, and the documentary also examines the subculture surrounding handfishing,

The film depicts noodling as believed to have originated with white settlers, with at least one reference dating from 1775. Most evidence suggests that Native Americans typically only fished using tools such as spears and cages.

Music
The soundtrack for Okie Noodling is performed by The Flaming Lips and was written specifically for the film.

References

External links

 Okie Noodling

2001 films
American sports documentary films
Films shot in Oklahoma
Documentary films about fishing
2001 documentary films
Films set in Oklahoma
Fishing in the United States
Sports in Oklahoma
2000s English-language films
2000s American films